There are 70 mammal species recorded in Jordan, of which two are endangered, ten are vulnerable, and three are near threatened.

The following tags are used to highlight each species' conservation status as assessed by the International Union for Conservation of Nature:

Order: Artiodactyla (even-toed ungulates) 

The even-toed ungulates are ungulates whose weight is borne about equally by the third and fourth toes, rather than mostly or entirely by the third as in perissodactyls. There are about 220 artiodactyl species, including many that are of great economic importance to humans.
Family: Bovidae (cattle, antelope, sheep, goats)
Subfamily: Antilopinae
Genus: Gazella
Dorcas gazelle, G. dorcas 
Mountain gazelle, G. gazella 
Arabian sand gazelle, G. marica 
Goitered gazelle, G. subgutturosa 
Subfamily: Caprinae
Genus: Capra
Nubian ibex, C. nubiana 
Subfamily: Hippotraginae
Genus: Oryx
Arabian oryx, O. leucoryx  reintroduced
Family: Cervidae (deer)
Subfamily: Cervinae
Genus: Capreolus
Roe deer, C. capreolus 
Family: Suidae (pigs)
Genus: Sus
Wild boar, S. scrofa

Order: Carnivora (carnivorans) 

There are over 260 species of carnivorans, the majority of which feed primarily on meat. They have a characteristic skull shape and dentition. 
Suborder: Feliformia
Family: Felidae (cats)
Subfamily: Felinae
Genus: Caracal
Caracal, C. caracal 
Genus: Felis
Jungle cat, F. chaus 
 African wildcat, F. lybica 
Sand cat, F. margarita 
Family: Herpestidae (mongooses)
Genus: Herpestes
Egyptian mongoose, H. ichneumon 
Genus: Urva
Small Indian mongoose, U. auropunctata 
Family: Hyaenidae (hyenas)
Genus: Hyaena
Striped hyena, H. hyaena 
Suborder: Caniformia
Family: Canidae (dogs, foxes)
Genus: Canis
Golden jackal, C. aureus 
Persian jackal, C. a. aureus 
Syrian jackal, C. a. syriacus 
Gray wolf, C. lupus 
 Arabian wolf, C. l. arabs 
Genus: Vulpes
Blanford's fox, V. cana 
Rüppell's fox, V. rueppellii 
Red fox, V. vulpes 
Family: Mustelidae (mustelids)
Genus: Lutra
Eurasian otter, L. lutra 
Genus: Meles
Caucasian badger, M. canescens 
Genus: Mellivora
Honey badger, M. capensis 
Genus: Mustela
Least weasel, M. nivalis

Order: Cetacea (whales) 

The order Cetacea includes whales, dolphins and porpoises. They are the mammals most fully adapted to aquatic life with a spindle-shaped nearly hairless body, protected by a thick layer of blubber, and forelimbs and tail modified to provide propulsion underwater.
Suborder: Mysticeti
Family: Balaenopteridae
Subfamily: Balaenopterinae
Genus: Balaenoptera
 Bryde's whale, B. edeni 
Subfamily: Megapterinae
Genus: Megaptera
Humpback whale, M. novaeangliae 
Suborder: Odontoceti
Superfamily: Platanistoidea
Family: Delphinidae (marine dolphins)
Genus: Grampus
 Risso's dolphin, G. griseus 
Genus: Pseudorca
 False killer whale, P. crassidens 
Genus: Stenella
 Pantropical spotted dolphin, S. attenuata 
 Spinner dolphin, S. longirostris 
Genus: Tursiops
 Common bottlenose dolphin, T. truncatus 
 Indo-Pacific bottlenose dolphin, T. aduncus

Order: Chiroptera (bats) 

The bats' most distinguishing feature is that their forelimbs are developed as wings, making them the only mammals capable of flight. Bat species account for about 20% of all mammals.
Family: Pteropodidae (flying foxes, Old World fruit bats)
Subfamily: Pteropodinae
Genus: Rousettus
Egyptian fruit bat, R. aegyptiacus 
Family: Vespertilionidae
Subfamily: Myotinae
Genus: Myotis
Lesser mouse-eared bat, M. blythii 
Long-fingered bat, M. capaccinii 
Geoffroy's bat, M. emarginatus 
Greater mouse-eared bat, M. myotis 
Natterer's bat, M. nattereri 
Subfamily: Vespertilioninae
Genus: Eptesicus
 Botta's serotine, E. bottae 
Genus: Hypsugo
 Desert pipistrelle, H. ariel 
Genus: Otonycteris
 Desert long-eared bat, O. hemprichii 
Genus: Pipistrellus
Kuhl's pipistrelle, P. kuhlii 
Genus: Plecotus
 Grey long-eared bat, P. austriacus 
Subfamily: Miniopterinae
Genus: Miniopterus
Common bent-wing bat, M. schreibersii 
Family: Rhinopomatidae
Genus: Rhinopoma
 Egyptian mouse-tailed bat, R. cystops 
 Lesser mouse-tailed bat, R. hardwickei 
 Greater mouse-tailed bat, R. microphyllum 
Family: Molossidae
Genus: Tadarida
European free-tailed bat, T. teniotis 
Family: Emballonuridae
Genus: Taphozous
 Naked-rumped tomb bat, T. nudiventris 
Family: Nycteridae
Genus: Nycteris
 Egyptian slit-faced bat, N. thebaica 
Family: Rhinolophidae
Subfamily: Rhinolophinae
Genus: Rhinolophus
Blasius's horseshoe bat, R. blasii 
 Geoffroy's horseshoe bat, R. clivosus 
Mediterranean horseshoe bat, R. euryale 
Greater horseshoe bat, R. ferrumequinum 
Lesser horseshoe bat, R. hipposideros

Order: Erinaceomorpha (hedgehogs and gymnures) 

The order Erinaceomorpha contains a single family, Erinaceidae, which comprise the hedgehogs and gymnures. The hedgehogs are easily recognised by their spines while gymnures look more like large rats.
Family: Erinaceidae (hedgehogs)
Subfamily: Erinaceinae
Genus: Paraechinus
 Desert hedgehog, P. aethiopicus

Order: Hyracoidea (hyraxes) 

The hyraxes are any of four species of fairly small, thickset, herbivorous mammals in the order Hyracoidea. About the size of a domestic cat, they are well-furred, with rounded bodies and a stumpy tail. They are native to Africa and the Middle East.
Family: Procaviidae (hyraxes)
Genus: Procavia
 Cape hyrax, P. capensis

Order: Lagomorpha (lagomorphs) 

The lagomorphs comprise two families, Leporidae (hares and rabbits), and Ochotonidae (pikas). Though they can resemble rodents, and were classified as a superfamily in that order until the early 20th century, they have since been considered a separate order. They differ from rodents in a number of physical characteristics, such as having four incisors in the upper jaw rather than two.
Family: Leporidae (rabbits, hares)
Genus: Lepus
Cape hare, L. capensis

Order: Rodentia (rodents) 

Rodents make up the largest order of mammals, with over 40% of mammalian species. They have two incisors in the upper and lower jaw which grow continually and must be kept short by gnawing.
Suborder: Sciurognathi
Family: Sciuridae (squirrels)
Subfamily: Sciurinae
Tribe: Sciurini
Genus: Sciurus
 Caucasian squirrel, S. anomalus 
Family: Gliridae (dormice)
Subfamily: Leithiinae
Genus: Eliomys
 Asian garden dormouse, E. melanurus 
Family: Dipodidae (jerboas)
Subfamily: Allactaginae
Genus: Allactaga
 Euphrates jerboa, A. euphratica 
Family: Spalacidae
Subfamily: Spalacinae
Genus: Nannospalax
 Palestine mole rat, N. ehrenbergi 
Family: Cricetidae (hamsters, voles, lemmings etc.)
Subfamily: Cricetinae
Genus: Cricetulus
 Grey dwarf hamster, C. migratorius 
Subfamily: Arvicolinae
Genus: Microtus
 Günther's vole, M. guentheri 
Family: Muridae (mice, rats, gerbils, jirds etc.)
Subfamily: Deomyinae
Genus: Acomys
 Cairo spiny mouse, A. cahirinus 
 Golden spiny mouse, A. russatus 
Subfamily: Gerbillinae
Genus: Gerbillus
 Anderson's gerbil, G. andersoni 
 Wagner's gerbil, G. dasyurus 
 Pygmy gerbil, G. henleyi 
 Balochistan gerbil, G. nanus 
Genus: Meriones
 Sundevall's jird, M. crassus 
 Libyan jird, M. libycus 
 Tristram's jird, M. tristrami 
Genus: Psammomys
 Sand rat, P. obesus 
Genus: Sekeetamys
 Bushy-tailed jird, S. calurus 
Subfamily: Murinae
Genus: Apodemus
 Broad-toothed field mouse, A. mystacinus 
Genus: Mus
 Macedonian mouse, M. macedonicus

Order: Sirenia (manatees and dugongs) 

Sirenia is an order of fully aquatic, herbivorous mammals that inhabit rivers, estuaries, coastal marine waters, swamps, and marine wetlands. All four species are endangered.
Family: Dugongidae
Genus: Dugong
Dugong, D. dugon

Order: Soricomorpha (shrews, moles, and solenodons) 

The "shrew-forms" are insectivorous mammals. The shrews and solenodons closely resemble mice while the moles are stout-bodied burrowers.
Family: Soricidae (shrews)
Subfamily: Crocidurinae
Genus: Crocidura
Lesser white-toothed shrew, C. suaveolens

Locally extinct 
The following species are locally extinct in the country:
Cheetah, Acinonyx jubatus
Hartebeest, Alcelaphus buselaphus
Wild goat, Capra aegagrus
Red deer, Cervus elaphus
Persian fallow deer, Dama mesopotamica
Onager, Equus hemionus
Lion, Panthera leo
Leopard, Panthera pardus
Brown bear, Ursus arctos

See also

Wildlife of Jordan
List of chordate orders
Lists of mammals by region
Mammal classification

References

External links

Jordan
Jordan
Mammals
Mammals